James Stephan Rossant (August 17, 1928 – December 15, 2009) was an American architect, artist, and professor of architecture.

A long-time Fellow of the American Institute of Architects, he is best known for his master plan of Reston, Virginia, the Lower Manhattan Plan, and the UN-sponsored master plan for Dodoma, Tanzania.  He was a partner of the architectural firm Conklin & Rossant and principal of James Rossant Architects.

Early life

Born in Sydenham Hospital, New York City, Rossant grew up in the Bronx, where he attended the Bronx High School of Science. He studied architecture at Columbia University, the University of Florida, and Harvard University's Graduate School of Design (under Walter Gropius).

Career

Almost immediately following university, Rossant served in Europe during the Korean War.

Architecture

After the war, he worked in Italy with Gino Valle (designer of the Cifra 3 clock).

In 1957, Rossant joined Mayer & Whittlesey as architect and town planner.  His first large design project was the Butterfield House apartment house in Greenwich Village (1962).  He also worked on the Lower Manhattan Plan.

For Whittlesey & Conklin, he developed the master plan for Reston, Virginia.

For Conklin & Rossant his work includes the Crystal Bridge of the Myriad Botanical Gardens (Oklahoma City),  the Ramaz School (New York City), Two Charles Center (Baltimore), and the U.S. Navy Memorial at Market Square (Washington, DC).

For 3R Architects, his work includes Tanzania's new capital at Dodoma under the sponsorship of the United Nations.  He served on New York City's Public Design Commission (formerly the Art Commission of the City of New York).

On November 2, 1971, Rossant appeared with Ada Louise Huxtable on the television show Firing Line on  discuss "Why Aren't Good Buildings Being Built?".  He appears posthumously from television clips and his wife in interviews as part of Rebekah Wingert-Jabi's 2015 documentary Another Way of Living:  The Story of Reston, VA.

Artwork

Rossant painted all his life and exhibited frequently (last in Paris, 2009).   His sculpture includes work publicly accessible on Washington Plaza along Lake Anne in Reston.  He published Cities in the Sky in 2009, based on one of his longest series of architectural paintings.  He also illustrated several cookbooks by his wife.

Teaching

Rossant taught architecture at the Pratt Institute (1970–2005) and Urban Design at New York University's School of Public Administration (1975–1983).  As lecturer, he visited the National University of Singapore, the American University of Beirut, Harvard University, the University of Virginia, and Columbia University.

Personal life and death

Rossant's brother was the journalist Murray Rossant.

He married Colette Palacci while serving in the army in Europe; the couple moved back the US in the mid-1950s.  The couple had four children.

He died near Condeau in the Orne portion of Le Perche, Lower Normandy, France, of complications arising from long-term, chronic lymphocytic leukemia (CLL).

Rossant was survived by his wife Colette Rossant (food critic, cookbook author, memoirist); children Marianne (educator), Juliette (author and journalist), Cecile (author and architect), and Tomas (architect); and eight grandchildren.

His nephew is John Rossant, founder of the New Cities Foundation (a global non-profit focused on the future of cities).  His cousins include British psychotherapist, Susie Orbach.

Works

James Rossant wrote a memoir which he published privately and shared with members of his family.

Writings:
 
 
 Articles (various)

Drawings:

See also
 Reston
 Dodoma
 Walter Gropius
 Rossant (surname)
 Colette Rossant

References

External links
 JamesRossant.com
 AIA New York Chapter

20th-century American architects
20th-century American Jews
Jewish architects
Columbia Graduate School of Architecture, Planning and Preservation alumni
Harvard Graduate School of Design alumni
1928 births
2009 deaths
Deaths from leukemia
Deaths from cancer in France
21st-century American Jews